Rubribacterium is an alkaliphilic  genus of bacteria from the family of Rhodobacteraceae. Rubribacterium polymorphum has been isolated from a Siberian soda lake.

References

Rhodobacteraceae
Bacteria genera
Monotypic bacteria genera